Tran may refer to:

Arts, media, and entertainment
 "Tran", a novel in the Janissaries series named for a fictional planet
 Dr. Tran, an animated miniseries

People
 Trần (陳), a Vietnamese surname 
 Tran, member of the Nazi-era comedy duo Tran and Helle

Places
 Tran, Bulgaria, a small town in Pernik Province, western Bulgaria
 Trần dynasty, 陳朝 a Vietnamese dynasty from 1225 to 1400

See also
 
 
 Trans (disambiguation)
 Tron (disambiguation)